The 2010 United States Senate election in South Carolina was held on November 2, 2010. Incumbent Republican U.S. Senator Jim DeMint won re-election to a second term, defeating Democratic nominee Alvin Greene. However, DeMint did not serve out the full term to which he was elected; he resigned in 2013 to become president of the Heritage Foundation.

As of 2022, this is the last election in which one of the two major parties' nominees for this Senate seat was not a person of color.

Democratic primary 
On June 8, 2010, Alvin Greene won the South Carolina Democratic primary for U.S. Senate, receiving 100,362 (59%) votes out of 170,215 votes cast; 69,853 (41%) went to Vic Rawl. Greene's victory over Rawl, a Charleston County councilmember and former state legislator, was described as an upset.

Candidates 
 Alvin Greene, U.S. Army veteran
 Vic Rawl, Charleston County Council member and former state legislator

Results

Republican primary

Candidates 
 Jim DeMint, incumbent U.S. Senator
 Susan McDonald Gaddy

Results

General election

Candidates 
 Jim DeMint (Republican), incumbent U.S. Senator
 Alvin Greene (Democratic), U.S. Army veteran
 Tom Clements (Green), environmental activist and Southeast Director Friends of the Earth

Campaign 
Controversies surrounded the Democratic nominee, Alvin Greene. At the time of his Senate campaign, Greene was unemployed and living with and caring for his father in Manning, South Carolina. Greene's primary election win and his margin of victory surprised pundits. As of the primary, he had held no public campaign events, raised no money, and did not have a campaign website.

U.S. Congressman Jim Clyburn recommended Greene drop out of the race or face a federal investigation into his candidacy, even as Greene faced a felony obscenity charge in Richland County from November 2009. Clyburn said, "There were some real shenanigans going on in the South Carolina primary. I don't know if he was a Republican plant; he was someone's plant." Political blog FiveThirtyEight's Tom Schaller suggested three possibilities: a legitimate vote, the vote was rigged, or the vote-counting software was corrupted. Schaller ruled out the possibility of Republican infiltration, similar to Rush Limbaugh's "Operation Chaos" in 2008.

In response to an official protest filed by Vic Rawl, who was defeated by Greene in the Democratic primary, the executive committee of the South Carolina Democratic Party conducted a formal hearing on June 17, 2010 to assess the legitimacy of the primary election results. Greene neither attended nor sent a representative to the hearing. The executive committee of the South Carolina Democratic Party voted 55 to 10 to reject Rawl's request for a new Senate primary, finding insufficient evidence of impropriety to disturb the primary election result.

At multiple points during the campaign, the South Carolina Democratic Party called for Greene to withdraw his candidacy. In August 2010, South Carolina Democratic Party chairwoman Carol Fowler asserted that the criminal charges against Greene would make it impossible for him to run a statewide campaign.

Green Party challenger Tom Clements won the endorsement of the Greater Columbia Central Labor Council of the South Carolina AFL-CIO, a coalition of labor unions. The Clements campaign received regional media coverage. A Winthrop University poll conducted between October 5 and 10, 741 likely South Carolina voters found Clements running second with 12.2% of the vote against 11.2% for Greene and 58.3% for incumbent Republican Sen. Jim DeMint. An October 13 article in the Columbia Free Times noted that prominent Democrats were privately donating money to the Clements campaign. According to the FEC, as of September 30, Clements for Senate had raised $34,334. DeMint had raised in excess of $3 million, while Greene reported no fundraising activities.

Write-in candidates also joined the race, including the Reverend Mazie Ferguson, Mauldin High School teacher Greg Snoad, Michael C Neumann, and chef Nathalie Dupree. Mazie Ferguson was endorsed by House Majority Whip Jim Clyburn in late August; Clyburn said he would not vote for Greene due to his felony indictment.

Greene has been described as an enigmatic figure in American politics. He is known for his "strange, well-documented behavior on the campaign trail". A study by the Pew Research Center released in late July 2010 found that Greene's campaign had received the most media attention of all of the 2010 political campaigns.

The Republican candidate, incumbent Senator Jim DeMint, largely campaigned outside South Carolina for Republican Senate candidates identified with the Tea Party.  Diverse media outlets frequently referred to DeMint as a party "kingmaker" for supporting successful primary challengers to mainstream Republican candidates.

At an October 3 appearance before a rally at Spartanburg North Baptist Church, DeMint reminded the audience of his 2004 comments that gay men and sexually active single women should be prohibited from teaching in public schools. The Spartanburg Herald-Journal reported:

The remarks attracted national media attention, largely critical. DeMint defended the statements, saying that local school boards should decide the issue. Challenger Tom Clements condemned DeMint's stance in a subsequent interview with the Herald-Journal:

"He's trying to push his version of religion onto the entire country. And I believe in separation of church and state. And I do believe that gay people should have equal rights," Clements said. "That's his belief, but I don't think he can force that on society as a whole or the public school system."

Endorsements

Organization endorsements 

Tom Clements:
 Sierra Club
 Columbia Central Labor Council (AFL-CIO)
 Friends of the Earth Action
 South Carolina Latino Political Action Committee

Jim DeMint
 National Rifle Association Political Victory Fund
 Citizens for a Sound Economy
 Americans For Legal Immigration

Newspaper endorsements 

Tom Clements:

 Rock Hill Herald

Jim DeMint:

 Florence Morning News
 Charleston Post and Courier

Predictions

Polling

Fundraising

Results

References

External links 
 South Carolina State Election Commission
 U.S. Congress candidates for South Carolina at Project Vote Smart
 South Carolina U.S. Senate from OurCampaigns.com
 Campaign contributions from Open Secrets
 2010 South Carolina Senate General Election: DeMint (R) vs Greene (D) graph of multiple polls from Pollster.com
 Election 2010: South Carolina Senate from Rasmussen Reports

 2010 South Carolina Senate Race from CQ Politics
 Race profile from The New York Times
Official campaign websites (Archived)
 Jim DeMint for U.S. Senate
 Alvin Greene for U.S. Senate

South Carolina
2010
2010 South Carolina elections